Park is a city in Gove County, Kansas, United States.  As of the 2020 census, the population of the city was 112.

History
Park was originally called Buffalo Park, and under the latter name established in the late 1870s. It was renamed Park in 1898 by postal officials.

Geography
Park is located at  (39.112299, -100.360501).

Climate
The climate in this area is characterized by hot, humid summers and generally mild to cool winters.  According to the Köppen Climate Classification system, Park has a humid subtropical climate, abbreviated "Cfa" on climate maps.

Demographics

2010 census
As of the census of 2010, there were 126 people, 63 households, and 29 families residing in the city. The racial makeup of the city was 96.8% White, 0.8% Native American, 0.8% Asian, and 1.6% from other races. Hispanic or Latino of any race were 1.6% of the population.

There were 63 households, of which 17.5% had children under the age of 18 living with them, 38.1% were married couples living together, 6.3% had a female householder with no husband present, 1.6% had a male householder with no wife present, and 54.0% were non-families. 46.0% of all households were made up of individuals, and 22.2% had someone living alone who was 65 years of age or older. The average household size was 2.00 and the average family size was 2.97.

The median age in the city was 48.3 years. 19.8% of residents were under the age of 18; 7.2% were between the ages of 18 and 24; 15.2% were from 25 to 44; 37.2% were from 45 to 64; and 20.6% were 65 years of age or older. The gender makeup of the city was 46.0% male and 54.0% female.

2000 census
As of the census of 2000, there were 151 people, 77 households, and 39 families residing in the city. The racial makeup of the city was 97.35% White, 1.32% Native American, and 1.32% from two or more races.

There were 77 households, out of which 19.5% had children under the age of 18 living with them, 44.2% were married couples living together, 6.5% had a female householder with no husband present, and 48.1% were non-families. 44.2% of all households were made up of individuals, and 24.7% had someone living alone who was 65 years of age or older. The average household size was 1.96 and the average family size was 2.70.

In the city, the population was spread out, with 17.2% under the age of 18, 6.6% from 18 to 24, 25.2% from 25 to 44, 28.5% from 45 to 64, and 22.5% who were 65 years of age or older. The median age was 46 years. For every 100 females, there were 88.8 males. For every 100 females age 18 and over, there were 86.6 males.

The median income for a household in the city was $28,750, and the median income for a family was $34,375. Males had a median income of $30,208 versus $22,500 for females. The per capita income for the city was $16,303. There were 8.9% of families and 10.1% of the population living below the poverty line, including no under eighteens and 10.3% of those over 64.

References

Further reading

External links

 Park - Directory of Public Officials
 Park City Map, KDOT

Cities in Kansas
Cities in Gove County, Kansas